José Simón Azcona Bocock (born 13 May 1972 in La Ceiba) is a Honduran businessman and politician, currently acts as deputy of the National Congress of Honduras representing the Liberal Party of Honduras for Francisco Morazán.

He is son of the late former President of Honduras José Azcona del Hoyo.

Political career
2000: Pre-candidate of the Liberal Party for Tegucigalpa
2002–2006: Council of Tegucigalpa
2006–2010: Deputy of the National Congress of Honduras for Francisco Morazán

References

1972 births
Living people
People from La Ceiba
Liberal Party of Honduras politicians
Deputies of the National Congress of Honduras